Events in the year 2021 in Jamaica.

Incumbents
 Monarch: Elizabeth II
 Governor-General: Patrick Allen
 Prime Minister: Andrew Holness
 Chief Justice: Bryan Sykes

Events
Ongoing — COVID-19 pandemic in Jamaica
5 February – Drought, increases in local demand, and a drop in the number of farmers all contribute to a marijuana shortage. The COVID-19 pandemic and related curfew means that farmers have a difficult time in irrigating their fields.
17 February – The Inter-American Commission on Human Rights releases a report that says the Jamaican government violated the rights of a gay man and a lesbian in 2011.
15 June – A drug smuggler has been jailed after more than £270,000 worth of cocaine was discovered hidden in food packets.

Deaths

4 January – Gordon "Butch" Stewart, hotelier (b. 1941).
9 January – Vivalyn Latty-Scott, 82, West Indies cricketer (Jamaica women's national cricket team, West Indies women's cricket team) and coach.
18 January
Easton Lee, 89, Anglican priest, playwright and broadcaster.
Yvonne Sterling, 65, reggae vocalist; stroke.
20 January – Ronnie Nasralla, 90, record producer (Byron Lee and the Dragonaires).
22 January – Luton Shelton, 35, footballer (Harbour View, Vålerenga, national team); complications from amyotrophic lateral sclerosis.
7 February – Leslie Laing, 95, athlete, Olympic champion (1952).
17 February – U-Roy, 78, reggae singer.
2 March – Bunny Wailer, 73, farmer reggae singer-songwriter and percussionist (The Wailers); complications from a stroke.

References

 
2020s in Jamaica
Years of the 21st century in Jamaica
Jamaica
Jamaica